Tupković Gornji is a village in the municipality of Živinice, Bosnia and Herzegovina.

Demographics 
According to the 2013 census, its population was 1,280.

References

 Tupković je najgore mjesto na planeti Zemlji

Populated places in Živinice